Pomacea baeri is a South American species of freshwater snail with gills and an operculum, an aquatic gastropod mollusc in the family Ampullariidae, the apple snails.

Distribution
P. baeri is endemic to Peru; it has been collected from the Río Mixiollo in Huallaga Province.

References

baeri
Molluscs of South America
Invertebrates of Peru
Gastropods described in 1902